Braham may refer to:

Braham (surname)
Braham, Minnesota, a city in the United States
Braham Murray (1943–2018), English theatre director
Braham (One Piece), a minor character in the Japanese anime One Piece

See also

 
Bahram (disambiguation)
Brabham (disambiguation)